Wólka Smolana  is a village in the administrative district of Gmina Smyków, within Końskie County, Świętokrzyskie Voivodeship, in south-central Poland.

The village had a population of 101 in 2011. 

Wólka Smolana is located near the Konecko-Łopuszniański protected area.

References

Villages in Końskie County